Katarina Kieri (born 15 January 1965) is a Swedish writer.

She was born in Luleå and studied recreation education at the Luleå College of Education. She taught for almost ten years and then took a course in creative writing. In 1993, she published a collection of poetry Slutet sällskap ("Private Party"). Kieri has also written columns for newspapers and magazines and worked as a radio broadcaster. She has served on the board for the Swedish Writers' Union and for the Swedish Authors' Fund.

In 2004, she was awarded the August Prize for a young adult novel Dansar Elias? Nej! ("Does Elias Dance? No!"). She received the Astrid Lindgren Prize in 2012 and is now a member of the jury for the Prize.

Kieri is married and has two daughters. She lives in Uppsala.

References 

1965 births
Living people
Swedish women children's writers
Swedish children's writers
Swedish women poets
People from Luleå